An Election to the Edinburgh Corporation was held on 3 November 1936, alongside municipal elections across Scotland. The election took place midst an increasingly sectarian political climate, with hardline Protestant and anti-Catholic political parties being on the rise in Glasgow and Edinburgh in the 1930s. The Protestant Action Society (PAS); Edinburgh's far-right Protestant grouping which had inspired a sectarian riot the previous year, won 31% of the vote and got 5 new members elected. The PAS had won 24% in the previous years election.

In Glasgow in 1933 a similarly strong showing by that city's insurgent Protestant party had split the Moderate vote, allowing in a Labour council for the first time in Glasgow's history. In contrast, despite the PAS's strong showing in Edinburgh, the dominant Progressives enjoyed such overwhelming majority over Labour that the PAS could hardly dent it. Labour, in turn, were relegated to third place.

Edinburgh Corporation at the time was made up of 71 members, of whom 69 were elected. Following the election the Corporation was composed of 46 Progressives/Moderates, 15 Labour, 8 Protestant Action, and 2 independents.

Turnout was 111,841, or 49.3%.

Aggregate results

Ward results

References

1936
1936 Scottish local elections
1930s in Edinburgh